The 2018 French Open – Men's Singles Qualifying was a series of tennis matches which took place 21 May 2018 to 25 May 2018 to determine the sixteen qualifiers into the main draw of the 2018 French Open – Men's singles. Eight competitors also qualified as lucky losers.

Seeds

Qualifiers

Lucky losers

Draw

First qualifier

Second qualifier

Third qualifier

Fourth qualifier

Fifth qualifier

Sixth qualifier

Seventh qualifier

Eighth qualifier

Ninth qualifier

Tenth qualifier

Eleventh qualifier

Twelfth qualifier

Thirteenth qualifier

Fourteenth qualifier

Fifteenth qualifier

Sixteenth qualifier

References 
 
2018 French Open – Men's draws and results at the International Tennis Federation

Men's Singles Qualifying
French Open by year – Qualifying